"Amie" is a song by the American country rock group Pure Prairie League. The song initially appeared on the band's 1972 album, Bustin' Out. It was subsequently released as a single in 1975, after it gained popularity as an album cut.

History
The song was written by Craig Fuller and was originally recorded by the band on their 1972 album Bustin' Out, but was not released as a single until 1975, following a suggestion by critic and Patti Smith Group guitarist Lenny Kaye at an RCA release party after gaining popularity on college and commercial radio stations as an album cut. Its airplay led RCA Records to re-sign Pure Prairie League after having previously dropped them.

Critical reception
In his book Music: What Happened?, musician and music critic Scott Miller described the song as "quintessentially 1972" and "lovely." Mike DeGagne of Allmusic called it "a charming little country-pop tune" and "their most memorable," praising its melody and Craig Fuller's lead vocals.  Rock historian John Einarson, citing the song's "lilting harmonies and subtle acoustic playing," called it "a classic of the country rock genre."

Cover versions
Double Eagle covered the song on the 1986 album Fire On The Prairie.

Lonestar covered the song on their 1997 album Crazy Nights, and included it as the B-side to the album's single "Say When".

Travis Tritt covered the song on Randy Scruggs' 1998 album, Crown of Jewels.

Wesley Willis covered the song to critical acclaim on his 1999 album Greatest Hits Vol. 2.

Singer Brent Anderson included a portion of "Amie" in his 2011 single "Amy's Song", which featured backing vocals from Craig Fuller and Vince Gill.

Counting Crows covered the song on their 2011 album of covers, Underwater Sunshine.

Garth Brooks covered the song on the "Melting Pot" disc of his four CD boxed set Blame It All on My Roots: Five Decades of Influences released in 2013.

Charts

References

1975 debut singles
RCA Records singles
Pure Prairie League songs
1972 songs